Urtica massaica is a species of flowering plant in the Urticaceae (nettle family) known by many English names, including Maasai stinging nettle and forest nettle. It is native to Africa, where it can be found in Congo, Burundi, Rwanda, Kenya, Uganda, and Tanzania.

This plant is a rhizomatous perennial herb up to 2 meters tall. It is covered in stinging hairs. The heart-shaped leaves are up to 13 centimeters long by 10.5 wide and have serrated edges. The plant is dioecious. The flowers are borne in panicles.

This plant is used for food and medicine in several African nations. It is used in Rwanda to treat diarrhea. The Maasai use it to treat stomach ache. They are used in Kenya to treat malaria. Other medicinal uses include treatment of fractures and venereal diseases.

The plant is also used to repel rats and to keep cattle out of crops.

Gorillas eat the plant.

References

Plants used in traditional African medicine
massaica
Leaf vegetables
Flora of East Tropical Africa
Flora of Burundi
Flora of the Republic of the Congo
Dioecious plants